Kosančić is a village in Serbia. It is situated in the Vrbas municipality, South Bačka District, Vojvodina province. The village has a Serb ethnic majority and its population numbering 163 people (2002 census).

Geography

Kosančić is located between Savino Selo, Pivnice, Lalić, Ruski Krstur and Kula. Today, Kosančić is regarded as separate settlement, but formerly, it was officially regarded as part of Savino Selo.

Ethnic groups (2002 census)

Serbs = 93
Hungarians = 15
Croats = 8
Montenegrins = 7
Ukrainians = 7
Slovaks = 3
Slovenians = 2
ethnic Muslims = 1
Rusyns = 1
other = 1
undeclared = 22
regional affiliation = 1
unknown = 2

References
Popis stanovništva, domaćinstva i stanova u 2002, Stanovništvo - nacionalna ili etnička pripadnost, podaci po naseljima, knjiga 1, Republički zavod za statistiku, Beograd, februar 2003.

See also
List of places in Serbia
List of cities, towns and villages in Vojvodina

Places in Bačka